Cyclidalis is a genus of snout moths. It was described by George Hampson in 1906, and contains the species Cyclidalis chrysealis. It is found in the Brazilian state of São Paulo.

References

Chrysauginae
Monotypic moth genera
Moths of South America
Pyralidae genera